Route 32 is a  primary north–south state highway in the U.S. state of Connecticut, beginning in New London and continuing  via Willimantic to the Massachusetts state line, where it continues as Route 32 in that state.

Route description

It is a freeway near the interchange with I-95 then becomes a limited access highway with at-grade intersections up to the Montville Connector (designated as State Road 693) — a freeway spur connecting Route 32 to I-395. It then becomes a mostly 2-lane surface road with the exception of the overlap with Route 2 in Norwich.

It goes through the following towns: New London, Waterford, Montville, Norwich, Franklin, Lebanon ( only), Windham, Mansfield, Willington, Tolland ( only), Ellington, and Stafford. From New London to Norwich, Route 32 follows along the west bank of the Thames River.

History
Route 32 between Norwich and New London was laid out in 1670 and remained little more than an Indian trail for more than a century . The number dates from when the route was part of New England Interstate Route 32 from 1922–1932. In 1932, Connecticut stopped using the New England route system, but Route 32 kept its number as a state highway. The north and south ends were also realigned in 1932. In the south, the original New England Route 32 ran along present day Route 12 from Groton to Norwich. The modern alignment from New London to Norwich used to be part of New England Route 12. (Route 12 and Route 32 have basically swapped places south of Norwich). In the north, the original New England Route 32 used present day Route 19 from Stafford to the Massachusetts state line. The modern alignment in Stafford was known as State Highway 334 in the 1920s before being reassigned to Route 32.

Junction list

See also

New England Interstate Route 32

References

External links

 Connecticut Roads

032
Transportation in New London County, Connecticut
Transportation in Windham County, Connecticut
Transportation in Tolland County, Connecticut
Transportation in Windham, Connecticut